Lindsay Thomas (born 29 February 1988) is a former professional Australian rules footballer who played for North Melbourne and Port Adelaide in the Australian Football League (AFL).

AFL career
Drafted by the Kangaroos in the fourth round of the 2006 AFL Draft from the Port Adelaide Magpies, Thomas made impressive performance by kicking four goals in his first pre-season game against Collingwood in the NAB Cup at Carrara Oval.

Thomas made his AFL debut in Round 1 of the 2007 season, scoring no goals but five behinds in a loss against Collingwood.

In 2010 Thomas led North Melbourne's goalkicking with 29 goals which included 7 against Carlton in Round 12.

The 2011 season was not a successful season for Thomas. He struggled badly with kicking for goal all year and was at one stage dropped from the senior side because of this. He finished the season with 21 goals and 36 behinds.

In 2012, Thomas' accuracy improved markedly and he kicked 38.19 for the season. The 38 goals for the season was his highest in a year so far. He played 19 games for the year, and was held goalless in only 3 of them. He played his 100th game in Round 12, 2012, against Gold Coast. In September 2012 he signed a two-year deal with the club to remain there until the end of 2014.

In 2013, Thomas had a career-best year, kicking 53 goals for the season. He also finished seventh in the Coleman Medal, the highest position for a small forward that year.

In the 2014 season Thomas he finished with 45 goals and played in 23 games. He continued to play well in 2015 and 2016 and kicked 34 and 37 goals in the seasons respectfully and played in nearly all games.

Thomas was delisted by North Melbourne at the end of the 2017 season. Port Adelaide flagged their interest in him following his delisting and then drafted him in the 2017 AFL rookie draft.

Thomas made his debut for Port Adelaide in round 5 of the 2018 season, kicking one goal in a 34 point loss to Geelong.

Ducking controversy

In 2016, Thomas sparked debate over high tackles and whether players are purposely getting taken high and milking a free kick. After the Round 10 game against Sydney, when Thomas allegedly ducked into two tackles, Hawthorn great Dermott Brereton said that Thomas' actions were "not in the spirit of the game". Numerous coaches and supporters said the head high free kicks should be looked at and singled out Thomas. However, the North Melbourne coach, Brad Scott, pointed out that there are many duckers in the league and it happens every week but everyone seems to blame Thomas.

References

External links

1988 births
Living people
North Melbourne Football Club players
Port Adelaide Football Club players
Port Adelaide Magpies players
Port Adelaide Football Club players (all competitions)
Indigenous Australian players of Australian rules football
Australian rules footballers from South Australia
North Ballarat Football Club players
Werribee Football Club players
Australia international rules football team players